Hestand is an unincorporated community in Monroe County, Kentucky, United States. There is an Amish like, so-called "para-Amish", Christian community at Vernon Community, Hestand.

References

Monroe County

Unincorporated communities in Monroe County, Kentucky
Unincorporated communities in Kentucky